is a Japanese professional wrestling promotion based in Shinjuku, Tokyo and founded in 1997. During the years, the promotion has held various notable pay-per-view events which feature professional wrestling matches that resulted from scripted storylines, where wrestlers portrayed villains, heroes, or less distinguishable characters in the scripted events that built tension and culminated in a wrestling match or series of matches.

Annual tournaments

Active

Former

Marquee events

Past Events

2007

2008

2009

2010

2011

2012

2013

2014

2015

2016

2017

2018

2019

2020

2021

2022

2023

Upcoming Events

Tokyo Dome Events
The Tokyo Dome stadium in Bunkyo, Tokyo, Japan has hosted a number of professional wrestling supercard events over the years. DDT has had held two of these kind of events in the venue.

Shared Events

Pro Wrestling Noah & Tokyo Joshi Pro Wrestling
Starting with 2021, due to being part of the CyberFight mother promotion, DDT began co-hosting the "CyberFight Festival" events alongside sister-promotions Pro Wrestling Noah and Tokyo Joshi Pro Wrestling.

Other promotions
During the years, DDT has held partnerships with various other promotions from the Japanese independent scene. The most notable events were the year-end pay-per-views in which DDT shared their work with other independent promotions between 2006 and 2012. The matches preponderently portraited confrontations between two or more wrestlers from different promotions.
{| class="wikitable" style="font-size:85%;"
!Event
!Date
!Location
!Venue
!Promotions
!Main event
!Ref
|-
| Indy Summit 2006 || December 31, 2006 || Tokyo, Japan || Korakuen Hall ||  || Gaina, Kengo Mashimo and Naoki Tanizaki vs. Daisuke Sekimoto, Harashima and Billyken Kid || 
|-
| Pro-Wrestling Summit in Korakuen || December 31, 2007 || Tokyo, Japan || Korakuen Hall || Various || Shuji Kondo, Yoshihito Sasaki and Daisuke Sekimoto vs. Kengo Mashimo, Harashima and Tetsuhiro Kuroda || 
|-
| Tenka Sanbun no Kei || 2007-2015 || Various || Various ||  || Multiple || 
|-
| Pro-Wrestling Summit 2008 || December 31, 2008 || Tokyo, Japan || Korakuen Hall || Various || Kengo Mashimo, Daisuke Sekimoto and Atsushi Aoki vs. Mammoth Sasaki, Yoshihito Sasaki and Shuji Ishikawa || 
|-
| Tenka Sanbun no Kei: Ōmisoka New Year's Eve Special || December 31, 2009 || Tokyo, Japan || Korakuen Hall ||  || 108-person New Year's Eve Rumble || 
|-
| Ōmisoka New Year's Eve Pro-Wrestling 2010 Countdown Special || December 31, 2010 || Tokyo, Japan || Korakuen Hall ||  || Kengo Mashimo, Yuko Miyamoto, Mammoth Sasaki, Munenori Sawa and Kazuhiro Tamura vs. Harashima, Shuji Ishikawa, Yoshihito Sasaki, Fujita "Jr." Hayato and Emi Sakura || 
|-
| New Year's Eve Pro-Wrestling 2011 || December 31, 2011 || Tokyo, Japan || Korakuen Hall ||  || 74-person tag team match || 
|-
| New Year's Eve Pro-Wrestling 2012 || December 31, 2012 || Tokyo, Japan || Korakuen Hall ||  || Falls count anywhere match won by Abdullah Kobayashi after defeating Shiori Asahi  ||

See also
List of DDT Pro-Wrestling personnel

References

External links

  
 [Streaming service|https://www.wrestle-universe.com/en] (English)

DDT Pro-Wrestling
DDT Pro-Wrestling shows
 
 
 
 
Professional wrestling shows
Professional wrestling-related lists